Alison Baker (born 1953 in Lancaster, Pennsylvania) is an American short story writer.

Life
She graduated from Reed College and Indiana University with a MLS.  She worked as a medical librarian and a library activist.

Her work has appeared in Shenandoah, the Atlantic Monthly, Story, Alaska Quarterly Review, Orion Nature Quarterly, the Washington Post, Witness, ZYZZYVA.

She was a Ragdale Foundation resident and a Fellow at Virginia Center for the Creative Arts.

Awards
 1992 George Garrett Fiction Award for "Field Notes"
 1994 O. Henry Award
 the Gettysburg Review Award
 George Garrett Award for Fiction
 finalist for the National Magazine Award.

Works

Anthologies
 The Best American Short Stories 1993
 Best of the West
 New Stories From the South
 Pushcart Prize.

References

External links
"Author's website"

1953 births
Living people
American short story writers
Reed College alumni
Indiana University alumni
O. Henry Award winners